The St. Jakob Stadium was a football stadium in Basel, Switzerland and the former home of Swiss club FC Basel. It was built in view of the 1954 FIFA World Cup, and as well as serving as a club stadium, it hosted several important matches, including some FIFA World Cup matches in 1954 and four European Cup Winners' Cup finals.

After closing in 1998, St. Jakob-Park was built in its place. It was nicknamed "Joggeli" (a diminutive of "Jakob" in the local dialect) by Basel supporters.

Important games

1954 World Cup
During the 1954 FIFA World Cup, St. Jakob Stadium hosted 4 group stage matches, one quarter-final match, and one semi-final match.

Other Major Events
Tickets and posters for a planned Madonna concert on 31 August 1987, were printed, but the event never materialised, because of failed negotiations between Madonna's management and the Swiss concert promoter. A gig in Nice, France was instead organised for that date.

The Rolling Stones performed here on 15 July 1982 on their European Tour, 26 June 1990 as part on their Urban Jungle Tour and July 29–30, 1995 as part of their Voodoo Lounge Tour.

Pink Floyd performed here on 26 July 1988 as part of their A Momentary Lapse of Reason Tour and on 6 and 7 August 1994 as part of their The Division Bell Tour.

Van Halen performed here on September 5, 1988, as part of their OU812 Tour.

AC/DC performed here on 25 August 1991 with Metallica, Queensryche and Mötley Crüe on their Monsters of Rock festival.

Tina Turner performed here 5 times during her Break Every Rule Tour on 27 June 1987, Foreign Affair: The Farewell Tour on 16 and 17 June 1990, What's Love? Tour on 3 September 1993, Wildest Dreams Tour on 5 July 1996.

Michael Jackson performed in front of 50,000 people during his Bad World Tour on 16 June 1988. Actress Elizabeth Taylor and singer Bob Dylan attended the show. Jackson planned a Dangerous World Tour concert in Basel on 11 September 1992 but the show was cancelled because the singer was ill. Jackson performed in Basel his last Swiss concert on 25 July 1997 in front of over 48,000 people during his HIStory World Tour.

References

FC Basel
1954 FIFA World Cup stadiums
Defunct football venues in Switzerland
Defunct sports venues in Switzerland
1954 establishments in Sweden
Sports venues completed in 1954
1998 disestablishments in Switzerland
20th-century architecture in Switzerland